Askepot (Musikken fra forestllingen i Tivolis Pantomime teater) is a soundtrack album recorded by Danish singer and songwriter Oh Land. The music is taken from a live opera that was broadcast in the Netherlands.

Track listing

References 

2016 live albums
Oh Land albums